Konstantinogradsky Uyezd (Константиноградский уезд) was one of the subdivisions of the Poltava Governorate of the Russian Empire. It was situated in the southeastern part of the governorate. Its administrative centre was Konstantinograd (present-day Krasnohrad).

Demographics
At the time of the Russian Empire Census of 1897, Konstantinogradsky Uyezd had a population of 230,310. Of these, 86.1% spoke Ukrainian, 11.8% spoke Russian, 1.1% spoke German, 0.9% spoke Yiddish and 0.1% spoke Belarusian as their native language.

References

 
Uezds of Poltava Governorate
Poltava Governorate